Elgin Albert Munro (11 October 1874 – 17 June 1931) was a Liberal party member of the House of Commons of Canada. He was born in Iroquois, Ontario, and became a farmer.

He was elected to Parliament at the Fraser Valley riding in the 1921 general election. After serving his only federal term, the 14th Canadian Parliament, Munro was defeated by Harry James Barber of the Conservatives in the 1925 federal election.

External links
 

1874 births
1931 deaths
Farmers from Ontario
Liberal Party of Canada MPs
Members of the House of Commons of Canada from British Columbia